= List of ambassadors of El Salvador to China =

This is a list of current and historical El Salvador ambassadors to Republic of China (Taiwan) and People's Republic of China (mainland).

== Ambassadors to Republic of China (1963-2018) ==
Diplomatic ties between Republic of China and El Salvador were first established in 1933 when the Nationalist government held control of mainland China while Taiwan was part of the Empire of Japan. Diplomatic relationship between two nations was established in 1941. China sent their first ambassador to El Salvador in 1941, and El Salvador sent theirs to China in 1963. The consulate of El Salvador was established in Taipei in October, 1976. El Salvador terminated its diplomatic relations with ROC on August 21, 2018, when it established diplomatic relations with People's Republic of China.

Name	Name in Chinese	Pronunciation (Pinyin)	Term start	Arrival in China	Diplomatic accreditation	Term end	Diplomatic rank	Note
Walter Beneke Medina	贝奈克	bèi nài kè		May 27, 1963	May 31, 1963	1965	Ambassador	Also El Salvador's Ambassador to Japan
Salvador Jáuregui Brizuela	郝里奇	hǎo lǐ qí		Feb 2, 1966	Feb 10, 1966	1971	Ambassador	Also El Salvador's Ambassador to Japan
Napoleón Baraóna	巴拉奥那	bā lā ào nà	Sep 20, 1971			1973	Counsellor	Initially the First Secretary
Walter Beneke Medina	贝奈克	-		Feb 14, 1973	Feb 16, 1973	Nov 1975	Ambassador	Also Ambassador to Japan
Gregorio Contreras	康特雷拉斯	kāng tè léi lā sī			Sep 9, 1976		Ambassador	Also Ambassador to Japan
José Dolores Gerardo Herrera	艾雷拉	ài léi lā		Sep 1977	Sep 16, 1977	Feb 1985	Ambassador	
Francisco Ricardo Santana Berríos	尚塔那	shàng tǎ nà		Oct 1985	Oct 24, 1985	1991	Ambassador	
David Eruesto Panamá Sandoval	巴纳马	bā nà mǎ		Oct 5, 1991	Nov 4, 1991	Aug 1999	Ambassador	
Francisco Ricardo Santana Berríos	尚塔那	-			Aug 30, 1999	Mar 31, 2010	Ambassador	
Marta Chang de Tsien	钱曾爱珠	qián zēng ài zhū			Aug 5, 2010	Aug 2018	Ambassador	Ethnic Chinese

== Ambassadors to People's Republic of China (Since 2018) ==
El Salvador established diplomatic relations with People's Republic of China on August 21, 2018, establishing its consulate on April 29, 2019.

Name	Name in Chinese	Pronunciation (Pinyin)	Term start	Arrival in China	Diplomatic accreditation	Term end	Diplomatic rank	Note
Walter Eduardo Durán Martínez	瓦尔特·爱德华多·杜兰·马丁内斯	wǎ ěr tè · ài dé huá duō · dù lán · mǎ dīng nèi sī	Sep 24, 2018	Oct 31, 2018		N/A (ambassador-designate)	Ambassador	Ambassador-Designate: named as ambassador but not yet taken office - waiting for the construction of embassy
Walter Eduardo Durán Martínez	瓦尔特·爱德华多·杜兰·马丁内斯	wǎ ěr tè · ài dé huá duō · dù lán · mǎ dīng nèi sī	Dec 31, 2018	N/A (already arrived)	Feb 20, 2019	2019	Ambassador	
Aldonov Frankeko Álvarez	阿尔多诺夫·弗兰克科·阿尔瓦雷斯	ā ěr duō nuò fū · fú lán kè kē · ā ěr wǎ léi sī		Jul 25, 2021	Apr 24, 2023	2024	Ambassador	
Luis Oswaldo López Álvarez	路易斯·奥斯瓦尔多·洛佩斯·阿尔瓦雷斯	lù yì sī · ào sī wǎ ěr duō · luò pèi sī · ā ěr wǎ léi sī		Nov 29, 2024	Dec 12, 2024	Current	Ambassador	
